Parliamentary elections were held in Cyprus on 22 May 2016 to elect 56 of the 80 Members of the House of Representatives.

Political system

The Republic of Cyprus is a unitary republic with a presidential system of government. The President of Cyprus, directly elected in the middle of the legislative term, is both head of state and head of government, presiding over the executive Council of Ministers. The multi-member proportional elections to the House of Representatives however accommodate a multi-party system, where the elected president's party usually joins forces with smaller parties to form a joint coalition government that usually adapts to parliamentary shifts after legislative elections.

Electoral system

The 80 seats in the House of Representatives are elected from six multi-member constituencies, with the number of seats allocated according to the population of each area. Of the 80 seats, 56 are elected by Greek Cypriots and 24 by Turkish Cypriots. However, due to the partition of the island in 1974, the 24 Turkish Cypriot seats are unfilled and the House of Representatives has de facto had 56 seats since its enlargement in the 1980s.

The elections are held using open list proportional representation, with seats allocated using the Hare quota. Any remaining seats are allocated to lists that won at least one seat or parties that received at least 3.6% of the vote. In the open list system, voters first select the list they want to vote for, and then select a number of candidates equal to a quarter of the number of seats in the constituency. Party leaders or other candidates heading coalitions are not required to receive preferential votes to be elected. Although compulsory voting had not been formally abolished at the time the elections took place (it was abolished in 2017), the law had not been enforced for years.

Background

2011
The previous legislative election took place on 22 May 2011. President Demetris Christofias of the communist Progressive Party of Working People (AKEL) had led a coalition consisting of his party as well as the centrist Democratic Party (DIKO) and the social-democratic Movement for Social Democracy (EDEK) since his election in 2008.

After three years in power, AKEL scored 32.7% in the 2011 legislative elections, narrowly behind the opposition center-right Democratic Rally, which polled 34.3% of votes. Meanwhile, AKEL's partners DIKO and EDEK scored 15.8% and 8.9% respectively. A mere two months after the legislative election, the Evangelos Florakis Naval Base explosion took place, triggering calls for President Christofias' resignation.

2013
Amidst widespread dissatisfaction and a deepening economic crisis, Christofias announced that he would not run for a second term in the presidential election in 2013. Ultimately, Nicos Anastasiades of DISY emerged victorious in the presidential election, taking 45.5% of the vote, against 26.9% for the AKEL-backed Stavros Malas and the EDEK-backed Giorgos Lillikas. In the second round, Anastasiades captured 57.5% to 42.5% for Malas. The Anastasiades administration took office on 28 February 2013, comprising DISY, DIKO and the European Party (EVROKO). The Democrats later pulled out of the coalition, however.

2014
Roughly a year into the presidency of Nicos Anastasiades, the Cypriot parties faced the electorate in European Parliament elections. Ahead of the election, DISY and EVROKO announced that they would participate in the election on a joint ticket; the social democrats in EDEK and the Ecological and Environmental Movement (KOP) also formed an electoral pact for the event. With the economic problems the country faced under Demetris Christofias' AKEL-led government fresh in the minds of voters, the party plummeted to 27.0% of the vote, a loss of 8.4% points. Meanwhile, the DISY-EVROKO pact garnered 37.8%. This election also served as the first electoral test of the Citizens' Alliance (SYPOL) party of former presidential candidate Giorgos Lillikas, which polled 6.8% but failed to win seats in the European Parliament. The decline of AKEL and the rise of anti-establishment parties continued into 2015 and 2016.

2016
Mere months before the 2016 legislative election, ex-DISY MEP Eleni Theocharous launched a splinter party, in opposition to Anastasiades' approach to the Cyprus issue. She advocated for tighter co-operation with other parties particularly DIKO and EDEK. The new party was dubbed the Solidarity Movement. On 11 March 2016, it was announced that EVROKO would merge into the new party, placing its candidates on its lists in the upcoming elections.

Parties and leaders

Electoral campaigns 
A televised debate of DISY leader Averof Neophytou, AKEL leader Andros Kyprianou and DIKO leader Nicolas Papadopoulos on 18 May 2016 turned into a heated exchange on economy issues and the question of reunification. Papadopoulos claimed that "behind closed doors", AKEL was trying to resurrect the 2004 Annan plan that was turned down by the Greek side in a referendum. While Neophytou and Papadopoulos criticized AKEL's judgment of the economic situation ahead of the 2012–13 Cypriot financial crisis, Kyprianou recalled his two rivals' assessments at that time. Back then in October 2008, Neophytou had expected things to go "very well", though "based on overconsumption", while Papadopoulos had gone even further off the mark stating: "Yes, our economy will be impacted, but certainly not our financial system, which is one of the most resilient in the world."

Opinion polls

Exit polls

Results

By district

Analysis and reception 
The election had the lowest turnout for a legislative election in the history of the Republic of Cyprus. "General apathy with public affairs, but likewise frustration with the credit crunch and disappointment with politicians" was cited in the Cyprus Mail for the low turnout, whilst political analyst Hubert Faustmann cited "dissatisfaction of the public with the bigger parties" and "that parliamentary elections in Cyprus are not that important, given the weakness of the Cypriot parliament". AKEL was seen as the biggest loser of the election, possible reasons being cited as the party's failure to take up a "proactive" role and continued disillusionment with the Christofias administration. In contrast, an AKEL member, Irini Charalambidou, gained the highest number of votes for any candidate, following her stark critique of and fight against failing banks. The results were interpreted as a weakening of the front calling for a federal solution by the Turkish Cypriot press and political analyst Louis Igoumenides. Whilst the pro-solution parties, DISY and AKEL, still received a combined 56% of the votes against 40% obtained by anti-solution parties, in the case of a referendum the "yes" vote was expected by Igoumenides to be much lower, partly due to the refusal of fanatic voters of DISY and AKEL to collaborate.

In terms of economics, the Anastasiades government became dependent on smaller parties to pass important reforms. This was expected to impede the ability of the government to pass these reforms, economic analyst Fiona Mullen said "I think we can forget privatization altogether". This was also the first time the far-right party ELAM entered the parliament. Anti-racist NGO KISA called upon political parties in the parliament to counter ELAM and stated its "concern over the number of absentee voters and the rightward drift of the electorate towards political parties that espouse racism and nationalism" and Turkish Cypriot daily Diyalog called the party "terrorist".

Cypriot electoral expert Yiannis Mavris said: "The electoral results herald a new political era for Cyprus. New small parties seem to be here to stay and will be exerting continuous pressure on traditional parties, which may find it difficult to win back their voters."

References

Legislative elections in Cyprus
Cyprus
Legislative
2010s in Cypriot politics
Cyprus
Cyprus